Fitzhugh Lee III (August 19, 1905 – January 20, 1992) was a vice admiral in the United States Navy. A graduate of the United States Naval Academy, he saw combat during World War II, earning the Navy Cross twice while serving as captain of the USS Manila Bay (CVE-61). He was a member of the Lee family.

Early life and education
Lee was born on August 19, 1905, to George Mason Lee (1877–1934), a U.S. Army Cavalry officer stationed in the Philippines, and his wife, Kathro Larrabee Burton (1878–1943). He was a grandson of former Virginia governor Fitzhugh Lee, great-grandson of Admiral Sydney Smith Lee, and great-great-grandson of "Light Horse Harry" Lee. He was a member of the United States Naval Academy's class of 1926.

Military career

After graduating from the academy, Lee served as a pilot, seeing service on the USS Enterprise (CV-6) before the outbreak of World War II. During the war, he was promoted to captain and was given command of the USS Manila Bay (CVE-61), which he saw through the Battle of Leyte Gulf and Battle off Samar. He was present at the signing of the Japanese Instrument of Surrender on September 2, 1945. During the administration of Harry S. Truman, Lee served as an aide to Navy Secretary John L. Sullivan. He retired in 1962.

Later life and death

Lee died in 1992 and was buried at sea in the Pacific Ocean, though a memorial exists in the family plot in Richmond, Virginia's Hollywood Cemetery beside his parents and grandparents.

References

1905 births
1992 deaths
Fitzhugh
Recipients of the Legion of Merit
Recipients of the Navy Cross (United States)
Recipients of the Navy Distinguished Service Medal
United States Naval Academy alumni
United States Navy admirals
American expatriates in the Philippines
United States Navy personnel of World War II